Summitt is a surname. Notable people with the surname include:

Pat Summitt (1952–2016), American college basketball coach
Tyler Summitt (born 1990), American college basketball player and coach, son of Pat

See also
Summit (disambiguation)

English-language surnames